Samir Hadjaoui (16 February 1979 – 16 May 2021) was an Algerian footballer who played as a goalkeeper.

Club career
Born in Tlemcen, Hadjaoui began his career with hometown club WA Tlemcen. He won two Algerian Cups and an Arab Cup with the side.

Having joined ASO Chlef in 2002, he won a third Algerian Cup.

Following a brief stint with CR Belouizdad he signed with ES Sétif. He contributed to two Algerian Championnat National titles and two Arab Champions League titles between 2006 and 2009.

He played four more seasons with JS Kabylie, WA Tlemcen, CS Constantine, and Paradou AC.

International career
Hadjaoui made his debut for the Algeria national team in an African Cup of Nations qualifier against Cape Verde on 2 June 2007, coming on as a substitute for Yacine Bezzaz after the starting goalkeeper Lounès Gaouaoui received a red card. He made his first start for the team in a 4–3 friendly loss against Argentina in Barcelona's Nou Camp, facing a 20-year-old Lionel Messi.

Death
Hadjaoui died on 16 May 2021 after a long illness.

Honours
WA Tlemcen
 Algerian Cup: 1997–98, 2001–02
 Arab Club Champions Cup: 1998

ASO Chlef
 Algerian Cup: 2004–05

ES Sétif
 Arab Champions League: 2006–07, 2007–08
 Algerian Championnat National: 2006–07, 2008–09

References

External links
 

1979 births
2021 deaths
People from Tlemcen
Algerian footballers
Association football goalkeepers
Algeria international footballers
Algerian Ligue Professionnelle 1 players
Algerian Ligue 2 players
WA Tlemcen players
ASO Chlef players
CR Belouizdad players
ES Sétif players
JS Kabylie players
Paradou AC players
21st-century Algerian people